Weymouth Hall is a historic mansion in Natchez, Mississippi.

Location
It is located at 1 Cemetery Road in Natchez, Adams County, Mississippi. It sits atop a bluff, overlooking the Mississippi River.

History
The mansion was built in 1850 for Colonel John Weymouth. It is two stories high with galleries at the front and at the back.

It is now used as a bed & breakfast. The house is mentioned by author Stark Young in his novel entitled, So Red the Rose.

Heritage significance
It has been listed on the National Register of Historic Places since March 12, 1980.

References

Houses on the National Register of Historic Places in Mississippi
Houses in Natchez, Mississippi
Houses completed in 1850
National Register of Historic Places in Natchez, Mississippi